Nabil Zalagh (born 13 February 1993) is a French judoka.

He is the bronze medallist of the 2018 Judo Grand Prix Agadir in the +100 kg category.

References

External links
 

1993 births
Living people
French male judoka
21st-century French people